"Have Mercy" is a song written by Paul Kennerley, and recorded by American country music duo The Judds.  It was released in September 1985 as the first single from the album Rockin' with the Rhythm.  The song was their fifth number one on the country chart.  The single went to number one for two weeks and spent a total of fourteen weeks on the country chart.

Chart performance

References

1985 songs
The Judds songs
1985 singles
Songs written by Paul Kennerley
RCA Records singles
Curb Records singles
Song recordings produced by Brent Maher